Uropterygius inornatus is a moray eel found in the western Indian Ocean and in the Pacific Ocean to Hawaii.  It is commonly known as the drab snake moray or black snake moray.  It is faded tan in colour.

References

inornatus
Fish described in 1958